Tanhyeon Station is a railway station on the Gyeongui-Jungang Line.

External links
 Station information from Korail

Seoul Metropolitan Subway stations
Railway stations opened in 2000
Metro stations in Goyang